Trichocybe is a genus of fungi in the order Agaricales. It is incertae sedis with respect to familial placement within the order. The genus was created in 2010 to contain the species Trichocybe puberula, originally described as a Clitocybe by Thom Kuyper in 1983.

References

Agaricales enigmatic taxa
Fungi of Europe
Monotypic Agaricales genera
Fungi described in 1983